Letloepe is a community council located in the Qacha's Nek District of Lesotho. Its population in 2006 was 14,527.

Villages
The community of Letloepe includes the villages of

F.T.C.
Ha 'Mamosa
Ha 'Manteko
Ha Bolokoe
Ha Hlapalimane
Ha Maluma
Ha Manteko
Ha Mosola
Ha Mphahama
Ha Mpiti
Ha Nkhahle
Ha Noosi

Ha Nqhoaki
Ha Ramoeletsi
Ha Ramoroke
Ha Thaha
Ha Tlali
Hill-Side
Keiting
Leropong
Lifofaneng
Liqalabeng
Liqhooeng

Liqoqoeng
Majakeng
Makaoteng
Makhalong
Makhaola High School
Malimong
Mapheleng
Matebeleng
Matšela-Habeli
Motse-Mocha
Police Station

Sekitsing
Sepetlele-sa-Khale
Terai Hoek
Tereseng
Thaba-Bosiu
Thaba-Tšoeu
Thifa
TJ
Tobotsa
Topa
White-City

References

External links
 Google map of community villages

Populated places in Qacha's Nek District